Shevat (Hebrew: שְׁבָט, Standard Šəvaṭ, Tiberian Šeḇāṭ; from Akkadian Šabātu) is the fifth month of the civil year starting in Tishre (or Tishri) and the eleventh month of the ecclesiastical year on the Hebrew calendar starting in Nisan. It is a month of 30 days. Shevat usually occurs in January–February on the Gregorian calendar.
The name of the month was taken from the Akkadian language during the Babylonian Captivity. The assumed Akkadian origin of the month is Šabātu meaning strike that refers to the heavy rains of the season.
In Biblical sources, the month is first mentioned by this name in the book of prophet Zechariah (Zechariah 1:7).

Holidays in Shevat
 15 Shevat – Tu Bishvat

Shevat in Jewish history and tradition

1 Shevat – Moses repeats the Torah (Deuteronomy 1:3)
2 Shevat (circa 1628 BC) – Asher born
10 Shevat (1950) - Death of the Previous Rebbe, the 6th Chabad Rebbe.
10 Shevat (1951) the Lubavitcher Rebbe formally accepts the leadership of the Chabad-Lubavitch movement by reciting the discourse "Bati Legani". 
22 Shevat (1988) - Death of Rebbetzin Chaya Mushka Schneerson, who was married to Rabbi Menachem Mendel Schneerson, the seventh Rebbe
24 Shevat (517 BC) – Zechariah's prophecy (Zechariah 1:7–16)
28 Shevat (circa 134 BC) – Antiochus V abandoned his siege of Jerusalem and his plans for the city's destruction. This day was observed as a holiday in Hasmonean times. (Megilat Taanit)

See also
 Babylonian calendar, where the month's name was Araḫ Šabaṭu
 Jewish astrology
 Šubāṭ and Şubat  is the name for the month of February in Arabic and Turkish.
 Magha is the name of the equivalent month in the Hindu Calendar

References

External links
 This Month in Jewish History
 Resources on the Month of Shevat

 
Months of the Hebrew calendar